is a Japanese actress and essayist from Nagoya. She was the Japanese voice of the title character San from the 1997 animated film Princess Mononoke. She is the older sister of Hikari Ishida, also an actress.

Filmography

Films
Gokudo no Onna-tachi: Saigo no Tatakai (1990) – Shiori Ueki
Boiling Point (1990) – Sayaka
Kanojo ga Kekkon Shinai Riyu (1990) – Reiko
Seishun Dendekedekedeke (1992)
Haruka, Nosutarujii (1993)
Pom Poko (1994) – Okiyo (voice)
Princess Mononoke (1997) – San (voice)
Himitsu (1999)
Yomigaeri (2002) – Reiko
Gege (2004) – Yōko Asamura
Year One in the North (2005) – Kayo Mamiya
Yokkakan no Kiseki (2005) – Mariko Iwamura
Fist of the North Star: The Legends of the True Savior (2007-2008)
About Her Brother (2010)
From up on Poppy Hill (2011)
The Mourner (2015) – Yukiyo Nagi
Erased (2016) – Sachiko Fujinuma
Cafe Funiculi Funicula (2018)
At the End of the Matinee (2019) – Yōko Komine
Hit Me Anyone One More Time (2019)
Silent Tokyo (2020) – Aiko Yamaguchi
Hope (2020) – Kiyomi Ishikawa
A Morning of Farewell (2021) – Tomoko Nakagawa
 Haw (2022) – narrator
Tokyo MER: Mobile Emergency Room: The Movie (2023) – Azusa Akatsuka

Television
101-kai me no puropozu (1991)
Over Time (1999)
Oyaji (2000)
Eien no Ko (2000)
Strawberry on the Shortcake (2001)
Dekichatta Kekkon (2001)
Bara no Jujika (2002) (mini)
Dr. Coto's Clinic (2003)
Pride (2004)
Ganbatte Ikimasshoi (2005)
Barefoot Gen (2007)
Ishitachi no Renai Jijou (2015)
The Full-Time Wife Escapist (2016) - Tsuchiya Yuri
BG: Personal Bodyguard (2018) - Aiko Tachihara
Tokyo MER: Mobile Emergency Room (2021) – Azusa Akatsuka

Dubbing
Dolittle,  Polynesia (2020)

References

External links
Official site 

JMDb profile 

Actors from Aichi Prefecture
Japanese film actresses
Japanese television actresses
1969 births
Living people
People from Nagoya
20th-century Japanese actresses
21st-century Japanese actresses